Sonja Vasić (born February 18, 1989) is a Serbian former professional women's basketball player. She represented the Serbia women's national basketball team.

Playing career 
Before she came to the WNBA, she played for Crvena zvezda, UB-Barça, Tango Bourges Basket and Spartak Moscow Region.

National team career
Vasić was a member of the Serbian national basketball team at the EuroBasket 2015 and at EuroBasket 2021 where they won the gold medal, they also qualified for the 2016 Olympics, first in the history for the Serbian team where they won bronze medal.

Career achievements and awards
 EuroLeague champion: 3 (with Spartak Moscow Region: 2008–09, 2009–10; with USK Praha: 2014–15)
 FIBA Europe SuperCup Women winner: 2 (with Spartak Moscow Region: 2009; with USK Praha: 2015)
 Czech League champion: 3 (with USK Praha: 2014–15, 2015–16, 2016–17)
 French League champion: 1 (with CJM Bourges: 2007–08)
 French Cup winner: 1 (with CJM Bourges: 2007–08)
 Federation Tournament winner: 1 (with CJM Bourges: 2007–08)

Individual
 EuroBasket Most Valuable Player – 2021
 EuroBasket All-Tournament Team – 2015, 2019, 2021
 Serbian Player of the Year – 2016, 2019, 2021
 Europe Young Player of the Year Award – 2007

Personal life 
In July 2019, Petrović married Miloš Vasić, a Serbian rower.

See also 
 List of Serbian WNBA players

References

External links
Sonja Petrović at basketball-reference.com
Sonja Petrović at eurobasket.com
Sonja Petrović at fiba.com
Sonja Petrović at fibaeurope.com

1989 births
Living people
Basketball players from Belgrade
Basketball players at the 2016 Summer Olympics
Basketball players at the 2020 Summer Olympics
Chicago Sky players
Competitors at the 2009 Mediterranean Games
European champions for Serbia
Medalists at the 2016 Summer Olympics
Mediterranean Games silver medalists for Serbia
Olympic basketball players of Serbia
Olympic bronze medalists for Serbia
Olympic medalists in basketball
Phoenix Mercury players
San Antonio Silver Stars draft picks
Serbian expatriate basketball people in the Czech Republic
Serbian expatriate basketball people in France
Serbian expatriate basketball people in Russia
Serbian expatriate basketball people in Spain
Serbian expatriate basketball people in the United States
Serbian women's basketball players
Small forwards
ŽKK Crvena zvezda players
Women's National Basketball Association players from Serbia
Mediterranean Games medalists in basketball